Burgruine Treffen is a castle in Carinthia, Austria.

See also
List of castles in Austria

References
This article was initially translated from the German Wikipedia.

Castles in Carinthia (state)